Shirley Troutman (born 1959/1960) is an American lawyer and jurist who has served as an associate judge of the New York Court of Appeals since 2022. She served as an associate justice of the New York Supreme Court, Appellate Division from 2016 to 2022.

Education 

Troutman received her Bachelor of Science from State University of New York at Buffalo in 1982 and her Juris Doctor from Albany Law School of Union University.

Legal and academic career 

During her legal career, Troutman served as an Assistant United States Attorney for the Western District of New York, as an assistant attorney general for the State of New York and an assistant district attorney for Erie County. She has served as an adjunct professor at University at Buffalo Law School and the Buffalo State College.

Judicial career 

Troutman was elected to the Buffalo City Court in 1994. She then served as a judge of the Erie County Court from 2003 to 2009. She later served as a justice of the Supreme Court, 8th Judicial District from 2010 to 2016. In February 2016, Governor Andrew Cuomo appointed Troutman to the New York Supreme Court, Appellate Division, Fourth Department.

New York Court of Appeals service 

In April 2021, Troutman was one of seven nominees recommended to Governor Andrew Cuomo to fill the vacancy left by the retirement of Judge Leslie Stein; that seat was eventually filled by Madeline Singas. On November 24, 2021, Governor Kathy Hochul nominated Troutman to the seat on the New York Court of Appeals vacated by Judge Eugene M. Fahey when he retired on December 31, 2021. The Senate confirmed her on January 12, 2022. Her formal investiture ceremony took place on April 5, 2022. Troutman is the second African-American woman to serve on the state court of appeals.

References

External links 

20th-century births
20th-century American judges
20th-century American women lawyers
20th-century American lawyers
21st-century American judges
African-American judges
African-American lawyers
Albany Law School alumni
Assistant United States Attorneys
Buffalo State College faculty
County district attorneys in New York (state)
Judges of the New York Court of Appeals
Living people
New York (state) state court judges
Place of birth missing (living people)
University at Buffalo alumni
University at Buffalo faculty
Year of birth uncertain
21st-century American women judges
20th-century American women judges